Alessandro "Alex" Britti (born 23 August 1968) is an Italian singer-songwriter and guitarist.

Biography
When he was 17, he started his first band, playing blues at clubs in Rome, and eventually moved to Milan. In 1989 he established the Alex Britti Blues Band. He has worked with Buddy Miles, Billy Preston, Louisiana Red and has toured Europe with Rosa King.

In the mid-1990s, he toured with Francesco De Gregori. The experience prompted Britti to switch to a more soft rock-oriented sound. He had his first hit in 1998 when "Solo una volta (o tutta la vita)" made it to the top of the Italian charts. In 1999 he won in the newcomers category at the San Remo festival with the song "Oggi sono io".

Discography

Albums
 1998 - It.Pop
 2000 - La vasca
 2003 - Tre
 2005 - Festa
 2008 - Alex Britti MTV Unplugged
 2009 - .23
 2013 - Bene così
 2015 – In nome dell'amore - Volume 1
 2017 – In nome dell'amore - Volume 2

Singles
 1998 - "Solo una volta (o tutta la vita)"
 1998 - "Gelido"
 1999 - "Oggi sono io"
 1999 - "Mi piaci"
 2000 - "Una su 1.000.000"
 2000 - "La vasca"
 2001 - "Sono contento"
 2003 - "7000 caffè"
 2003 - "La Vita sognata"
 2003 - "Lo Zingaro Felice"
 2005 - "Prendere o lasciare"
 2006 - "Festa"
 2006 - "Quanto ti amo"
 2006 - "Solo con te"
 2006 - "Notte di mezza estate"
 2008 - "Milano"
 2008 - "L'Isola Che Non C'è"
 2009 - "Piove"
 2009 - "Buona fortuna"
 2011 - "Immaturi"
 2013 - "Baciami (e portami a ballare)"
 2013 - "Bene così"
 2014 - "Non È Vero Mai" (Bianca Atzei ft. Alex Britti)
 2015 - "Ciao Amore, ciao" (Bianca Atzei ft. Alex Britti)
 2015 - "Perché?"

References

External links
Official site

1968 births
Living people
Italian pop singers
Italian male singers
Italian singer-songwriters
Sanremo Music Festival winners of the newcomers section
Singers from Rome
Italian blues guitarists
Italian blues musicians
Italian male guitarists